Jean Bouttiau (3 September 1889 – 4 March 1957) was a Belgian footballer. He played in six matches for the Belgium national football team from 1911 to 1912.

References

External links
 

1889 births
1957 deaths
Belgian footballers
Belgium international footballers
Place of birth missing
Association football midfielders